Chegem (Çegem) is a town and the administrative center of Chegemsky District of the Kabardino-Balkar Republic, Russia, located  north of Nalchik, at the elevation of about . Population:

History
Originally called Chegem Pervy, it was granted urban-type settlement status in 1972. In 2000, it was granted town status and renamed Chegem.

Administrative and municipal status
Within the framework of administrative divisions, Chegem serves as the administrative center of Chegemsky District, to which it is directly subordinated. As a municipal division, the town of Chegem is incorporated within Chegemsky Municipal District as Chegem Urban Settlement.

Demographics
Population:

Ethnic composition
As of the 2002 Census, the ethnic distribution of the population was:
Kabardins: 81.7%
Balkars: 12.5%
Russians: 3.4%
Other ethnicities: 2.4%

References

Notes

Sources

External links
Official website of Chegem 
Chegem Business Directory 

Cities and towns in Kabardino-Balkaria